Shakir Seyidov (born 31 December 2000) is an Azerbaijani footballer who plays as a midfielder for Turan-Tovuz in the Azerbaijan Premier League.

Club career
On 24 November 2018, Seyidov made his debut in the Azerbaijan Premier League for Sabah match against Qarabağ.

References

External links
 

2000 births
Living people
Association football midfielders
Azerbaijani footballers
Azerbaijan youth international footballers
Azerbaijan under-21 international footballers
Azerbaijani expatriate footballers
Expatriate footballers in Latvia
Azerbaijan Premier League players
Sabah FC (Azerbaijan) players
BFC Daugavpils players